Kenneth Dieter Waldichuk (born January 21, 1998) is an American professional baseball pitcher for the Oakland Athletics of Major League Baseball (MLB).

Amateur career
Waldichuk attended University City High School in San Diego, California. He earned First-Team All League honors as a junior in 2015. Unselected in the 2016 Major League Baseball draft, he fulfilled his commitment to play college baseball at Saint Mary's College of California.

In 2017, as a freshman at Saint Mary's, Waldichuk appeared in 22 games as a relief pitcher, pitching to a 3–4 win-loss record with a 2.00 earned run average (ERA) and 51 strikeouts over 45 innings pitched. He was named to the All-West Coast Conference Freshman Team. That summer, Waldichuk pitched for the Bethesda Big Train of the Cal Ripken Collegiate Baseball League where he appeared in six games, threw 23.2 innings and had an ERA of 3.42. As a sophomore in 2018, he moved into the starting rotation, starting 14 games and pitching to an 8–4 record and a 2.05 ERA over  innings, earning All-WCC First Team honors. In 2018, he played collegiate summer baseball with the Wareham Gatemen of the Cape Cod Baseball League. In 2019, his junior year, Waldichuk made 15 starts, going 5–6 with a 3.69 ERA with 106 strikeouts over  innings.

Professional career

New York Yankees
After the season, the New York Yankees selected Waldichuk in the fifth round (165th overall) of the 2019 Major League Baseball draft. He signed with the Yankees and made his professional debut with the Pulaski Yankees of the Rookie-level Appalachian League, going 0–2 with a 3.68 ERA over  innings. To begin the 2021 season, he was assigned to the Hudson Valley Renegades of the High-A East. After throwing  scoreless innings to begin the year, he was promoted to the Somerset Patriots of the Double-A Northeast. Over 16 games (14 starts) with Somerset, Waldichuck pitched to a 4–3 record and 4.20 ERA with 108 strikeouts over  innings. 

Waldichuk returned to Somerset to begin the 2022 season. After four starts in which he pitched to a 4–0 record and 1.26 ERA over  innings, he was promoted to the Scranton/Wilkes-Barre RailRiders of the Triple-A International League. He was selected to represent the Yankees at the 2022 All-Star Futures Game. Over 11 starts with the RailRaiders, Waldichuk went 2-3 with a 3.59 ERA and seventy strikeouts over  innings.

Oakland Athletics
On August 1, 2022, the Yankees traded Waldichuk, JP Sears, Luis Medina, and Cooper Bowman to the Oakland Athletics for Frankie Montas and Lou Trivino. He was subsequently assigned to the Las Vegas Aviators of the Triple-A Pacific Coast League. The Athletics promoted him to the major leagues on September 1 to make his major league debut the following day.

References

External links

1998 births
Living people
Major League Baseball pitchers
Baseball players from San Diego
Oakland Athletics players
Saint Mary's Gaels baseball players
Bethesda Big Train players
Wareham Gatemen players
Pulaski Yankees players
Hudson Valley Renegades players
Somerset Patriots players
Scranton/Wilkes-Barre RailRiders players
Las Vegas Aviators players